Klokov is a surname. Notable people with the surname include:

Alexey Klokov (born 1965), Russian painter
Dmitry Klokov (born 1983), Russian weightlifter
Michail Klokov (1896–1981), Ukrainian-Soviet botanist
Vyacheslav Klokov (born 1959), Russian heavyweight weightlifter

Russian-language surnames